Amphicutis is a genus of brittle stars of the family Amphilepidae. It contains a single species, Amphicutis stygobita.

References

Pomory, C.M.; Carpenter, J.H. & Winter, J.H. 2011. Amphicutis stygobita, a new genus and new species of brittle star (Echinodermata: Ophiuroidea: Ophiurida: Amphilepididae) found in Bernier Cave, an anchialine cave on San Salvador Island, Bahamas. Zootaxa 3133: 50-68.

Amphilepididae
Monotypic echinoderm genera
Ophiuroidea genera